Heinz Fenrich (born 9 February 1945, in Unteröwisheim, (today Kraichtal))  is a German Christian Democratic Union politician who most notably served as the lord mayor (Oberbürgermeister) of Karlsruhe from 1998 to 2013.

Fenrich received the Order of Merit of Baden-Württemberg in 2005 and the Order of Merit of the Federal Republic of Germany in 2013. He is a Honorary Citizen of Krasnodar.

References

External links
Heinz Fenrich. Entry on the Karlsruhe Wiki.

1945 births
Living people
Christian Democratic Union of Germany politicians
Mayors of places in Baden-Württemberg
Politicians from Karlsruhe
Recipients of the Order of Merit of Baden-Württemberg
Officers Crosses of the Order of Merit of the Federal Republic of Germany